The Lux Veritatis Foundation is a Polish religious organization founded in Warsaw in 1996 by two Redemptorists: Fr. Tadeusz Rydzyk and Fr. Jan Król. It is the owner of the Trwam TV. In 2006, it got the concession to explore thermal water in Toruń.

References

Far-right politics in Poland
Foundations based in Poland